William H. Clement (born December 20, 1950) is a Canadian former professional ice hockey player who became an author, speaker, actor, entrepreneur, and hockey broadcaster.

Clement played 11 seasons in the National Hockey League (NHL), and was named an All-Star twice. He spent his first four years with the Philadelphia Flyers, with whom he won two Stanley Cup championships (1974, 1975). Clement later played for the Washington Capitals, whom he captained, and the Flames, both in Atlanta and Calgary.

Clement has broadcast five different Olympic Games and has worked for ESPN, NBC, ABC, Versus, Comcast SportsNet and TNT in the U.S., and CTV, CBC, Rogers Sportsnet and Sirius XM Radio in Canada.

His acting credits include work on the ABC daytime drama All My Children and more than 300 television ads for clients such as Chevrolet, Bud Light, and Deepwoods Off. He was also one of the in-game announcers on EA Sports' NHL video games from NHL 07 through NHL 14, as well as on 2K Sports' NHL 2K series in ESPN NHL Hockey and ESPN NHL 2K5.

Biography

Playing career
Prior to his career as a broadcaster, Clement was an amateur and NHL hockey player. Born in Buckingham, Quebec, he played hockey as a child in nearby Thurso with Guy Lafleur. He played Junior Hockey with the Ottawa 67s of the O.H.A., in their first three seasons.

Originally selected 18th (second round) in the 1970 NHL Entry Draft by the Philadelphia Flyers (the Flyers' first pick of the draft), Clement played four seasons with the Flyers (as well as in minor league teams at Quebec City and Richmond, VA), and was part of the Stanley Cup-winning Flyers teams of 1973–74 and 1974–75 as the 4th line Center. Prior to the 1975 NHL Amateur Draft, he was traded to the Washington Capitals for their right to draft Mel Bridgman, as the first overall draft pick that year. After playing just 46 games with the Capitals (and serving as the team captain) in the 1975–76 season, he was then traded to the Atlanta Flames for Gerry Meehan, Jean Lemieux and a Round 1 pick in the 1976 NHL Amateur Draft. He would play with the Flames organization in both Atlanta and Calgary, until his retirement following the 1981–82 NHL season. He played in two NHL All-Star Games, in 1976 and 1978. In 719 regular season games, he scored 148 goals, earned 206 assists, and 383 penalty minutes. In 50 playoff games, he collected five goals and three assists.

Clement was known for a calm and consistent passing game, leading to the rhyme "Clement, Clement, Hands of Cement." Bud Light referenced the old taunt in one of their popular "Hockey Falls" commercials.

Post-playing career
From  until  he worked for SportsChannel America as lead color commentator on their national telecasts and regional Philadelphia Flyers games, both with Emrick.

He worked with Jim Lampley as a studio analyst for NBC during their coverage of both the men's and women's ice hockey tournaments at the 2002 Winter Olympics in Salt Lake City. He worked as the play-by-play announcer for table tennis, pentathlon events, and badminton tournaments for the 2004 and 2008 Summer Olympics for NBC. He won province championships playing badminton in high school. He also worked as an analyst in ESPN's Great Outdoor Games for several years.

He provided color commentary for the EA Sports' NHL series for NHL 2000 and NHL 2001, with Jim Hughson; and for all next-generation versions from NHL 07 through NHL 14, with Gary Thorne. The latter duo previously voiced 2K Sports' NHL 2K series for ESPN NHL Hockey and ESPN NHL 2K5, when 2K Sports had the ESPN license.

He is also host of a Flyers-based radio talk show on WBCB 1490 AM in Bucks County, Pennsylvania. The show includes current and former players and coaches, as well as players from the ECHL's Trenton Devils. He also continues to provide color commentary, as well as post-game show analysis, working several local Flyers broadcasts for NBC Sports Philadelphia and The Comcast Network since the 2007–08 season.

From –, he broadcast at least one game of every Stanley Cup Finals series (with ESPN from –, SportsChannel America from –, ESPN again from –, and ABC from –).

In January 2021, Clement announced his retirement from broadcasting at the age of 70.

Personal life
After retirement from hockey, he married and had two children, and resides in Solebury Township, Pennsylvania. His daughter Reagan graduated from The Hun School of Princeton in 2007, while his son Chase graduated from New Hope-Solebury High School in 2008 and now goes to Delaware Valley College where he plays soccer as their goalkeeper and was First Team All Freedom Conference Player in 2012. 
Clement became a U.S. citizen on November 4, 2010.
Bill Clement was first married to Cathie (née Maclarty) of Ottawa, Ontario. They have a daughter Christa, and grandchildren.

Career statistics

References

External links
 BillClementSpeaking.com
 Bill Clement: Keynote Speaker, Athlete, Actor (official website).
 "EveryDay Leadership: Crossing Gorges on Tightropes to Success"
 
 Profile at hockeydraftcentral.com

1950 births
Anglophone Quebec people
Atlanta Flames players
Calgary Flames players
Canadian ice hockey centres
Canadian television sportscasters
Ice hockey people from Gatineau
Living people
National Hockey League All-Stars
National Hockey League broadcasters
Ottawa 67's players
Philadelphia Flyers announcers
Philadelphia Flyers draft picks
Philadelphia Flyers players
Quebec Aces (AHL) players
Richmond Robins players
Stanley Cup champions
Washington Capitals captains
Washington Capitals players